Koepelgevangenis may refer to one of these prisons:

 Koepelgevangenis (Arnhem)
 Koepelgevangenis (Breda)
 Koepelgevangenis (Haarlem)

See also:

 Panopticon, the type of prison used.
 Jeremy Bentham, who came up with the Panopticon idea.